The Fokker C.X was a Dutch biplane scout and light bomber designed in 1933. It had a crew of two (a pilot and an observer).

Design and development

The Fokker C.X was originally designed for the Royal Dutch East Indies Army, in order to replace the Fokker C.V. Like all Fokker aircraft of that time, it was of mixed construction, with wooden wing structures and a welded steel tube frame covered with aluminium plates at the front of the aircraft and with fabric at the rear. The prototype was built in 1934 with a Rolls-Royce Kestrel V engine.

The East Indies Army ordered 13 C.Xs, but they were soon replaced in the scout/light bomber role by the American Martin B-10s. Until the Japanese attack on the Dutch East Indies in 1941, the C.X remained in use as a trainer and target tug.

The Dutch Air Force ordered 16 C.Xs, and later four more with Kestrel IIS engines. These four were later re-equipped with Kestrel V engines; the Kestrel IIS proved not very reliable.

Two C.Xs were delivered to the Spanish Republic, and four more to Finland. The Finns also license-produced 35 C.Xs until 1942. These C.Xs were equipped with Bristol Pegasus XII engines.

Airspeed Ltd. in Great Britain got a license to build C.Xs for the British market as the Airspeed AS.22, but no orders were received.

Operational history
During the German attack on the Netherlands in May 1940, the C.Xs served in their intended role as scouts and light bombers. The tactic of "hugging the ground" allowed the C.Xs to achieve some success. Two C.Xs and their crews escaped to France after the Dutch surrender.

The Finnish C.Xs served with distinction in the Winter War, the Continuation War and the Lapland War. The C.X was the most important short-range reconnaissance aircraft and dive bomber of the Finnish Air Force at the outbreak of the Winter War. There were 29 of them in combat units, the "Frans-Kalle" was slow but possessed a robust airframe, making it a useful asset. The maximum dive speed was 540 km/h, which enabled it to break away from the Soviet I-153 and I-16 fighters. As hostilities continued, losses began to mount. During the Winter War 8 FKs were lost. The last of the seven Finnish C.Xs that survived the war crashed in 1958. The craft, designated FK-111, served as a target-towing craft in the Finnish Air Force. The plane crashed into a forest on 21 January 1958, killing the pilot (Second Lieutenant Aimo Allinen) and the winch-operator (2nd Ltn Antti Kukkonen).

Variants
 C.X Series I  : Fokker-built aircraft for the Dutch using an inline engine
 C.X Series II : Fokker-built, 4 to Finland
 C.X Series III: Licence-built in Finland, had modified upper wings which were slightly more swept.
 C.X Series IV : Licence-built in Finland, 5 planes which were put together from spare parts.

Operators

 Finnish Air Force (39)

 Royal Netherlands Air Force (20)
 Royal Netherlands East Indies Army Air Force (13)

 Republican Spanish Air Force (2)

Specifications (Fokker C.X)

See also

References

References

Bibliography
Taylor, H.A.. Airspeed Aircraft since 1931. Putnam. 1970. London. 

1930s Dutch bomber aircraft
C 10
Aircraft of the Royal Netherlands East Indies Army
Biplanes
Single-engined tractor aircraft
Aircraft first flown in 1933